Frill may refer to:

 Frill (fashion), a form of trimming
 Neck frill, the relatively extensive margin seen on the back of the heads of some reptiles
 Frill, the reverse feathering on the chests of varieties of fancy pigeon
 John Frill (1879-1918), Major League Baseball pitcher

See also
 No-frills (disambiguation)